Mozart's Piano Quartet No. 1 in G minor, K. 478, is scored for violin, viola, cello, and pianoforte. It was composed in 1785.

Composition and reception
Mozart received a commission for three quartets in 1785 from the publisher Franz Anton Hoffmeister. Hoffmeister thought this quartet was too difficult and that the public would not buy it, so he released Mozart from the obligation of completing the set. (Nine months later, Mozart composed a second quartet anyway, in E-flat major, K. 493).

Hoffmeister's fear that the work was too difficult for amateurs was borne out by an article in the Journal des Luxus und der Moden published in Weimar in June 1788. The article highly praised Mozart and his work, but expressed dismay over attempts by amateurs to perform it:

[as performed by amateurs] it  not please: everybody yawned with boredom over the incomprehensible tintamarre of 4 instruments which did not keep together for four bars on end, and whose senseless concentus never allowed any unity of feeling; but it  please, it  to be praised! ... what a difference when this much-advertised work of art is performed with the highest degree of accuracy by four skilled musicians who have studied it carefully.

The assessment accords with a view widely held of Mozart in his own lifetime, that of a greatly talented composer who wrote very difficult music.

At the time the piece was written, the harpsichord was still widely used. Although the piece was originally published with the title "Quatuor pour le Clavecin ou Forte Piano, Violon, Tallie [sic] et Basse," stylistic evidence suggests Mozart intended the piano part for "the 'Viennese' fortepiano of the period" and that, according to Basil Smallman, our modern piano is "a perfectly acceptable alternative."

Movements

The work is in three movements:
 Allegro, in G minor
 Andante, in B-flat major
 Rondo (Allegro), in G major

Editions and versions

The C. F. Peters Edition set of parts has rehearsal letters throughout the whole work; the Eulenburg Edition study score has measure numbers but no rehearsal letters, the same goes for Bärenreiter.

The quartet is also available in an arrangement for string quintet.

Notes

References

External links 
 
 
 
 Performance of Piano Quartet No. 1 by the Nash Ensemble from the Isabella Stewart Gardner Museum in MP3 format

Chamber music by Wolfgang Amadeus Mozart
Mozart 1
Compositions in G minor
1785 compositions